GUB may refer to:
 Gub, a 1991 album by Pigface
 GUB (cuneiform), a sign in cuneiform writing
 Glashütte Original, a German watchmaker
 Global University Bangladesh
 Guerrero Negro Airport, in Baja California, Mexico
 Gub (Glangevlin), a townland in the parish of Glangevlin, County Cavan, Republic of Ireland
 Gub (Kinawley), a townland in the parish of Kinawley, County Cavan, Republic of Ireland

See also 
 Guajajara language (ISO 639 code: gub)